The 2005 Toyota Grand Prix of Long Beach was the first round of the 2005 Bridgestone Presents the Champ Car World Series Powered by Ford season, held on April 10, 2005 on the streets of Long Beach, California.  Paul Tracy was the polesitter and the race winner was Sébastien Bourdais.

Qualifying results

Race

Caution flags

Lap leaders

 Average Speed 89.811 mph

External links
 Full Weekend Times & Results
 Friday Qualifying Results
 Saturday Qualifying Results
 Race Box Score

Long Beach
Grand Prix of Long Beach
Toyota Grand Prix